Whitford James Richard Brown  (13 May 1910 – 14 April 1986) was the foundation mayor of Porirua City, a city in the Wellington Region of New Zealand, for 21 years from 1962 to 1983. Previously, Porirua was part of what was then called the Makara County Council. In 1961, the Local Government Commission deemed that Porirua should become a borough. The region had its first elections in October 1962, and, Brown was elected mayor.

Biography
Whitford James Richard Brown was born at Maori Creek near Greymouth in the South Island on 13 May 1910. He moved to Wanganui as a teenager, then transferred from the New Zealand Public Works Department to the New Zealand Railways Department at Wanganui, where he worked as a civil engineer until shifting to Porirua East in Christmas 1954 to work in the New Zealand Railways head office in Wellington.

After his marriage to Frances Ward, daughter of New Zealand astronomer Joseph Thomas Ward, Brown and his family settled in Porirua East. Their 4 Martin Street home was one of many in the Government's state housing scheme but, at this time, there were relatively few houses at all in the area and remote from shops and other facilities.

He first stood for the then Makara County Council in 1959, and although he was unsuccessful, was elected at a by-election the following year.

Mayor of Porirua
Two years later, when Porirua was constituted a borough, Brown was elected mayor. His first official function was to open the Mungavin Avenue Community Hall in Porirua East. His first concern as mayor was to obtain industrial land and the then Prime Minister of New Zealand Keith Holyoake proved most helpful, becoming one of Brown's closest friends.

The new borough negotiated with the government to free land where the Todd Motors car assembly plant was built in 1975, and Broken Hill was also zoned industrial use. Other major industries were also established as well as a modern shopping centre where there once had been empty space. "It was like being the midwife at the birth of a new community," Brown once said.

Porirua became a city in 1965 and Brown was the city's first mayor, and was re-elected at every election until he retired from the mayoralty in 1983.

In his 21 years as Mayor, Brown took humble pride in heading a multicultural city and did his utmost to promote racial harmony. Jocularly but with humility he termed himself "The only white mayor called Brown in New Zealand".

Ahead of the  he put himself forward for the Labour Party nomination to stand in the newly created  electorate, but lost to Gerry Wall.

In 1970, he was the recipient of the Winston Churchill Memorial Trust Award and spent three and a half months studying pollution problems overseas. In 1975 Brown was caught on Mungavin Avenue while driving under the influence of alcohol and the ensuing conviction resulted in the loss of his seats on the Porirua Licensing Trust Board and the Wellington Harbour Board.

1980 saw the establishment of a sheltered workshop for handicapped people at Titahi Bay, a suburb of Porirua, which bears his name: "The Whitford Brown Community Workshop", which is designed to help people with disabilities get back into the workforce.

Brown died on 14 April 1986, following an accident at home (cerebral haemorrhage). Following cremation, his ashes were buried at Whenua Tapu Cemetery in Porirua.

Honorific eponym
In 1970 Whitford Brown Avenue just north of the Porirua Shopping Centre was named in his honour.

Awards and honours
In the 1972 Queen's Birthday Honours, Brown was appointed an Officer of the Order of the British Empire, for services as mayor of Porirua. He was promoted to Commander of the same order, for services to the city of Porirua, in the 1984 New Year Honours. In 1977, Brown was awarded the Queen Elizabeth II Silver Jubilee Medal.

Brown was closely associated with many Porirua and regional community and business organisations over the years; including:

 Member Hutt Valley Energy Board (1983–1986)
 Trustee Wellington Trustee Savings Bank (1975–1986)
 Chairman of Porirua College Board of Governors (1966–1983)
 Wellington Regional Councillor (1980–1983)
 Wellington Harbour Board (1974–1975)
 Trustee Porirua Licensing Trust (1968–1975)
 Patron of the Maraeroa Community Trust (1972–1986)

References

 Golden wedding anniversary article in the Wellington paper THE EVENING POST: "MAYORAL COUPLE CELEBRATE" - By Tim Donoghue.
 "Porirua Public Library Records"
 "His death closes a chapter", Kapi Mana News, 22 April 1986
 "Porirua's Mayor is deeply involved in community", Kapi Mana News, 21 July 1973
 "Long Serving Mayor dies", Kapi Mana News, 15 April 1986
 "Porirua's former mayor pleased with portrait", Kapi Mana News, 14 May 1985
 Text of News Feature on the City of Porirua and its foundation Mayor for 21 years, by freelance writer Jane Symonds
 Whitford's eldest son: Derek Brown
 Whitford's Granddaughter: Angela Daymond

1910 births
1986 deaths
New Zealand people in rail transport
Mayors of Porirua
Wellington regional councillors
Burials at Whenua Tapu Cemetery
New Zealand Commanders of the Order of the British Empire
Wellington Harbour Board members
20th-century New Zealand politicians
Accidental deaths in New Zealand